Mishaal Al-Saeed (born in July 18, 1983) is a Saudi Arabian football player who currently plays as a defender for Al-Wehda in the Saudi Professional League.

International goals

References

External links 
Saudi League Profile

1983 births
Living people
Saudi Arabian footballers
Saudi Arabia international footballers
2011 AFC Asian Cup players
People from Eastern Province, Saudi Arabia
Hajer FC players
Ittihad FC players
Ettifaq FC players
Al-Fateh SC players
Al-Wehda Club (Mecca) players
Saudi First Division League players
Saudi Professional League players
Association football defenders